Kristina Anna Maria Lundberg (born 10 June 1985) is a Swedish ice hockey player. She was born in Husum, and won a silver medal at the 2006 Winter Olympics.

References

1985 births
Living people
Ice hockey players at the 2006 Winter Olympics
Medalists at the 2006 Winter Olympics
Olympic ice hockey players of Sweden
Olympic medalists in ice hockey
Olympic silver medalists for Sweden
People from Örnsköldsvik Municipality
Swedish women's ice hockey forwards
Sportspeople from Västernorrland County